Wikstroemia ligustrina is a shrub, of the family Thymelaeaceae.  It is native to China, specifically Hebei, Shaanxi, Shanxi, Sichuan, and Yunnan.

Description
The shrub grows up to 0.5 to 1.5 m tall. Its branches are erect, broom-like and it flowers in autumn. It is often found in forest margins and shrubby slopes at altitudes of 1900 to 2700 m.

References

ligustrina